I will have your back always... is a statue by Benjamin Victor, installed in Boise's Idaho State Veterans Cemetery, in the U.S. state of Idaho, in 2021.

References

2021 establishments in the United States
2021 sculptures
Buildings and structures in Boise, Idaho
Outdoor sculptures in the United States
Statues in the United States